Betawi, also known as Betawi Malay, Jakartan Malay, or Batavian Malay is the spoken language of the Betawi people in Jakarta, Indonesia. It is the native language of perhaps 5 million people; a precise number is difficult to determine due to the vague use of the name.

Betawi Malay is a popular informal language in contemporary Indonesia, used as the base of Indonesian slang and commonly spoken in Jakarta TV soap operas and some animated cartoons (e.g. Adit Sopo Jarwo). The name Betawi stems from Batavia, the official name of Jakarta during the era of the Dutch East Indies. Colloquial Jakarta Indonesian, a vernacular form of Indonesian that has spread from Jakarta into large areas of Java and replaced existing Malay dialects, has its roots in Betawi Malay. According to Uri Tadmor, there is no clear border distinguishing Colloquial Jakarta Indonesian from Betawi Malay.

Background

The origin of Betawi is of debate to linguists; many consider it to be a Malay dialect descended from Proto-Malayic, while others consider it to have developed as a creole. It is believed that descendants of Chinese men and Balinese women in Batavia converted to Islam and spoke a pidgin that was later creolized, and then decreolized incorporating many elements from Sundanese and Javanese (Uri Tadmor 2013).

Betawi has large amounts of Hokkien Chinese, Arabic, Portuguese, and Dutch loanwords. It replaced the earlier Portuguese creole of Batavia, Mardijker. Cocos Malay, spoken in the Cocos (Keeling) Islands, Australia and Sabah, Malaysia is believed to have derived from an earlier form of Betawi Malay.

Dialects

Betawian Malay is divided into two main dialects;
 Middle Betawi dialect:  Originally spoken within Jakarta with a greater use of e (e.g.  becomes ).
 Suburban Betawi dialect:  Originally spoken in suburban Jakarta, Tangerang in Banten, Depok, Bogor, and Bekasi in West Java. It has a greater use of extended a (e.g. , pronounced ).

Another Suburban Betawi variant is called Betawi Ora, which was highly influenced by Sundanese.

Betawi is still spoken by the older generation in some locations on the outskirts of Jakarta, such as Kampung Melayu, Pasar Rebo, Pondok Gede, Ulujami, and Jagakarsa.

There is a significant Chinese community which lives around Tangerang, called Cina Benteng, who have stopped speaking Chinese and now speak Betawian Malay.

Examples :
  (formal),  (middle),  (suburban),  (informal): 'I'
  (formal),  (informal or intimate): 'you'
  (strong e, not schwa like Johor and Riau accent), : 'yes'
 ,  ( variant): 'no'
 : 'Where will you go, uncle?'
 : 'My stuff has been sold out.'

The ending of every Betawi word that ends with an "a" is pronounced "e" like in the English word net. The "e" is pronounced in a way different from the way Johor and Riau Malays pronounce it.

Sample

English 
All human beings are born free and equal in dignity and rights. They are endowed with reason and conscience and should act towards one another in a spirit of brotherhood.

Malay

Betawi

See also 
Hikayat Abu Samah, a Betawi text

References

Bibliography

External links
Documentation of Betawi

An example of Betawi language conversation

Malay-based pidgins and creoles
Languages of Indonesia